Jowai (IPA: ʤəʊˈwaɪ) is the headquarters of the West Jaintia Hills district of the state of Meghalaya, India, and is home to the Pnar, a sub-tribe of the Khasi people. It is 
located on a plateau surrounded on three sides by the Myntdu river bordering Bangladesh to the south (about 50 km from the Indo-Bangladesh border). Due to its high altitude of 1365 m above sea level, Jowai experiences warm summers with cool to chilly winters.

Jowai is an important business and education hub for the entire district, catering to local students as well as those from the adjacent parts of Assam and Bangladesh. It is well equipped with infrastructure including schools, colleges, hospitals, and a postal service. As with the Nongphlang (Khynriams), Pnars too have a matriarchal society where daughters inherit the family property.

Connectivity

Jowai is well connected by roadways to Shillong, which is 64 km away. The town of Jowai lies on the National Highway 44 (NH 44) which connects Assam, Meghalaya, Tripura, Mizoram and parts of Manipur, specifically Lamka (Churachandpur), where the Highway NH 44 is the sole link to it.

A few buses operate along this route. The district's most popular modes of transport are the Tata Sumo and the Tata Indica, which function on a shared passenger basis. The charge for traveling from Shillong to Jowai by either a Tata Sumo or Tata Indica is र100, with fairly good availability throughout the day.

The district has no rail or air links. The nearest rail service  is in Guwahati, Assam, about 160 km away, serving many destinations. Umroi Airport (E.K Mawlong Airport), the nearest airport, has a service with limited flights to Kolkata.

Tourist spots

The town is relatively quiet with respect to tourism. Most tourist attractions are a short distance from town, except for the "Iaw Musiang," one of the oldest market areas in the district.

Other attractions include:

Syntu Ksiar – A valley well irrigated by the Myntdu River. Also called "Madan Madiah" or "Uncle's Ground," it is situated in the valley and has historical importance as the site of the freedom struggle's rise. Today, the ground has a monument of U Kiang Nangbah, a fighter of the Khasi people.
Tyrshi Falls – A waterfall located at approximately 8 km from the heart of Jowai.
Jowai Presbyterian Church – The oldest church in Jaintia Hills, built by the Welsh Presbyterian Mission in the latter part of the 19th century. It is one of the few structures in town that retain British architectural influence.
Thadlaskein lake – A popular tourist spot. It was dug by Sajar Nangli, a follower of the former Jaintia King.

Ialong Park – An ecological park with a view of the Pynthor Wah valley and the Myntdu river.

Jowai Teer – One of the popular gambling sports in Jowai. Its origins are unknown.

Festivals and food

Behdeinkhlam, a major festival of the Pnars, is a 4-day event that takes place during the month of July. "Behdienkhlam" literally means "to drive away evils and plague." It is a festival celebrated in all parts of Jaintia Hills. Today, local Christians usually do not participate in it, but it is celebrated with pomp and show amongst followers of the traditional Niamtre religion.
This festival is associated with a series of religious rites. Dancing takes place in the street to the accompaniment of drums and pipe playing. Although women do not participate in dancing, they have an important role to play at home by offering sacrificial food to the spirits of the ancestors.

In the afternoon, Datlawakor, a form of soccer with a wooden ball, is played between two teams from the upper and lower valleys of the Myntdu River. Those in the team who wins are believed to be blessed with a good harvest.

Other festivals include Laho Dance and Chad Sukra.

Meat and fish, particularly pork, are delicacies. A variety of savoury pork dishes like Jadoh, Doh Khleh, Doh Jem and Doh Snam, are prepared according to traditional recipes. Chicken, fresh fish, and beef are also among the dishes prepared in a unique style distinct from usual curries. A strong smelling Tungtoh, made from fermented beans, and Tungtap, a variant of dry fish, are two of the most popular forms of local chutney.

Demographics

The major inhabitants are the Pnar people. Other inhabitants include Nongphlang (Khynriams), War, Biates, Karbis, Marwaris, Bengalis, and Nepalis.

As of the 2001 India census, Jowai had a population of 28,430. Males constitute 49% of the population and females 51%. Jowai has an average literacy rate of 76%, higher than the national average of 59.5%; male literacy is 77%, and female literacy is 75%. In Jowai, 17% of the population is under 6 years of age.

Politics

Governance in the ancient Jaintia Kingdom was in the form of the Jaintia king (Syiem) from their capitals at Jaintiapur and Nartiang, with Jaintia Ministers (Dollois) each ruling over a specific "Elaka" (geographical region). The Dollois held high positions in society as well as in the Syiem's court. With the advent of the British rule, the Syiem was ripped off his position, with the Dollois left with some limited powers. Jaintia Hills is divided into twelve Elakas, each under a Doloi (nominal ruler).

Apart from the ancient form, people of Jaintia Hills have their representatives in the Meghalaya Legislative Assembly seated at the capital, Shillong. The present Member of the Legislative Assembly from 2-Jowai Constituency is Mr. Wailadmiki Shylla, National Peoples' Party.

Jaintia Hills District also has its own Autonomous Council as per the provisions given in the Sixth Schedule of the Constitution, known as Jaintia Hills Autonomous District Council (which is separate from the Khasi Hills Autonomous District Council, which is seated at Jowai town itself). Jowai town has four members of district council constituencies. They are:
 
 Mr. Madonbai Rymbai (25-Amwi Khliehtyrshi MDC Constituency)
 Mr. Marki Mulieh (27-Jowai North MDC Constituency)
 Mr. Moonlight Pariat (28-Jowai Central MDC Constituency)
 Mr. A.Shullai (29-Jowai South MDC Constituency)

One member is elected from the Shillong Parliamentary Seat as a Member of Parliament (seated at New Delhi). The incumbent MP is Mr. Vincent Pala, INC, a domicile of East-Jaintia Hills.

The upcoming MLA Election is scheduled to be held in 2018 followed by the MDC and MP Elections in 2019.

Institutions in Jowai 
Technical institutes
Jowai Polytechnic
Nursing institutes
Dr. Norman Tunnell Hospital School of Nursing
Colleges and institutions providing higher studies
Kiang Nangbah government college
Khad-ar Daloi Law College
Thomas Jones Synod College
Northeast Adventist College
Prominent schools and higher secondary institutions
North Liberty Higher Secondary School 
KJP Synod Mihngi Higher Secondary School
Seinraij higher Sec School
Govt. Boys Higher Secondary School
Govt. Girls Higher Secondary School
Tome Memorial Secondary School
Marian Hill Higher Secondary school
St. Mary Mazarello Girls Higher Secondary School
Little Angels Secondary School
Jowai Public school
HK Singh Secondary school
Faith academy Secondary School
Che's Star Secondary School
Jaintia Eng Secondary School
Little Flower Secondary School
Amwi Secondary School
Jowai District Presbyterian School
All Saints Diocesan School

Localities in Jowai 

Dulong
Panaliar
Loom Pyrdi Iongpiah
Loom-iong-Kjam
Loom Kyrwiang
Tpep Pale
Chilliang Raij
Umshyniar
Lumpariat
Ladthadlaboh
Caroline Colony
Dongmihsngi
New Hill
Tyndowapung
Mynthong
Chutwakhu
Moosalyngkat
Mooralong
Memory Colony
Mookyrdup
Khim-u-sniang
Tympang Iaw Musiang
Mission Compound
Salaroh
Riat Siatsim
Khlieh Myngkrem
Salini Colony

References

External links 
Meghalaya State Government Portal
Jaintia Hills District homepage
Department of Tourism, Government of Meghalaya

Geography of Meghalaya
Hill stations in Meghalaya
West Jaintia Hills district
Cities and towns in West Jaintia Hills district